National Youth Commission can refer to:
National Youth Commission (Philippines)
Youth Development Administration in Taiwan, the National Youth Commission until 2013.